Boogie with Canned Heat is the second studio album by American blues and rock band Canned Heat. Released in 1968, it contains mostly original material, unlike their debut album. It was the band's most commercially successful album, reaching number 16 in the US and number 5 in the UK.

Boogie with Canned Heat includes the top 10 hit "On the Road Again", one of their best-known songs.  "Amphetamine Annie", a warning about the dangers of amphetamine abuse, also received considerable airplay.  "Fried Hockey Boogie" was the first example of one of Canned Heat's boogies, or loose jams.  When released on CD in 2005, six tracks originally released on singles were included as bonus tracks.

In 2012, Boogie with Canned Heat was remastered and released on CD by Iconoclassics Records with the original 10 tracks, plus 6 bonus tracks.

Critical reception
The Encyclopedia of Popular Music called the album an "impressive selection," and praised the "in-concert favourite" "Fried Hockey Boogie". Rolling Stone wrote that "'An Owl Song' is perhaps Al Wilson's strongest vocal outing to date — his peculiarly high crooning mumble grooving along over a kicking, chugging rhythm section."

Track listing

Side one
"Evil Woman" (Larry Weiss) – 2:59
"My Crime" (Canned Heat) – 3:57
"On the Road Again" (Floyd Jones, Alan Wilson) – 5:01
"World in a Jug" (Canned Heat) – 3:29
"Turpentine Moan" (Canned Heat) – 2:56
"Whiskey Headed Woman No. 2" (Bob Hite) – 2:57

Side two
"Amphetamine Annie" (Canned Heat) – 3:36
"An Owl Song" (Alan Wilson) – 2:43
"Marie Laveau" (Henry Vestine) – 5:18
"Fried Hockey Boogie" (Larry Taylor) – 11:07

Bonus tracks from 2005 CD release
"On the Road Again"
"Boogie Music"
"Goin' Up the Country"
"One Kind Favor"
"Christmas Blues"
"The Chipmunk Song (Christmas Don't Be Late)" (featuring Alvin and the Chipmunks)

Bonus tracks from 2012 CD release
"On the Road Again [Alternate Take]" (Floyd Jones and Alan Wilson)
"Shake, Rattle and Roll" (Charles E. Calhoun)
"Whiskey and Wimmen'" (John Lee Hooker)
"Mean Old World" (Little Walter, T-Bone Walker, Marl Young)
"The Hunter" (Carl Wells, Steve Cropper, Al Jackson, Jr., Booker T. Jones, Donald Dunn)
"Fannie Mae" (Buster Brown, Clarence Lewis, Bobby Robinson)

Personnel
Canned Heat
Bob Hite – lead vocals
Alan Wilson – slide guitar, lead vocals on "On the Road Again" and "An Owl Song", harmonica
Henry Vestine – lead guitar
Larry Taylor – bass guitar
Adolfo de la Parra – drums

Additional Personnel
Dr. John – horn arrangements, piano
Sunnyland Slim – piano on "Turpentine Moan"

Production
Dino Lappas – engineer
Dallas Smith – producer

References 

1968 albums
Canned Heat albums
Liberty Records albums
Albums arranged by Dr. John